The men's K-1 1000 metres sprint canoeing event at the 2020 Summer Olympics took place on 2 and 3 August 2021 at the Sea Forest Waterway. At least 15 canoeists from at least 15 nations competed.

Background
This was the 20th appearance of the event, one of four events to have appeared every Summer Games since the introduction of canoeing in 1936.

The reigning World Champion is Bálint Kopasz of Hungary. The reigning Olympic champion is Marcus Walz of Spain, who will not defend his title; he is not among the 6 men's kayakers on Spain's team for 2020.

Qualification

A National Olympic Committee (NOC) could qualify one place in the event, though could enter up to 2 boats if it earned enough quota places through other women's kayak events. A total of 13 qualification places were available, initially allocated as follows:

 1 place for the host nation, provided it qualified no other men's kayak places
 5 places awarded through the 2019 ICF Canoe Sprint World Championships
 6 places awarded through continental tournaments, 1 per continent except 2 places for Europe
 1 place awarded through the 2021 Canoe Sprint World Cup Stage 2.

Qualifying places were awarded to the NOC, not to the individual canoeist who earned the place. Two additional spots were added: a Tripartite Commission invitation (for Amado Cruz of Belize) and a Refugee Olympic Team invitation for Saeid Fazloula.

The World Championships quota places were allocated as follows:

Continental, World Cup, and other places:

Nations with men's kayak quota spots from the K-1 200 metres, K-2 1000 metres, or K-4 500 metres could enter (additional) boats as well.

Competition format
Sprint canoeing uses a four-round format for events with at least 11 boats, with heats, quarterfinals, semifinals, and finals. The specifics of the progression format depend on the number of boats ultimately entered.

The course is a flatwater course 9 metres wide. The name of the event describes the particular format within sprint canoeing. The "K" format means a kayak, with the canoeist sitting, using a double-bladed paddle to paddle, and steering with a foot-operated rudder (as opposed to a canoe, with a kneeling canoeist, single-bladed paddle, and no rudder). The "1" is the number of canoeists in each boat. The "1000 metres" is the distance of each race.

Schedule
The event was held over two consecutive days, with two rounds per day. All sessions started at 9:30 a.m. local time, though there are multiple events with races in each session.

Results

Heats
Progression System: 1st-2nd to SF, rest to QF.

Heat 1

Heat 2

Heat 3

Heat 4

Heat 5

Quarterfinals
Progression: 1st-2nd to SF, rest out.

Quarterfinal 1

Quarterfinal 2

Quarterfinal 3

Semifinals 
Progression System: 1st-4th to Final A, rest to Final B.

Semifinal 1

Semifinal 2

Finals

Final A

Final B

References

Men's K-1 1000 metres
Men's events at the 2020 Summer Olympics